Jason's Lyric is a 1994 American erotic romantic psychological drama film, written by Bobby Smith Jr., directed by Doug McHenry, who co-produced the film with George Jackson and Marilla Lane Ross, and starring Allen Payne, Jada Pinkett, Bokeem Woodbine, Treach, Eddie Griffin, Lahmard Tate, Lisa Nicole Carson, and Forest Whitaker. Set in Third Ward, Houston, Texas, the story is about two mentally scarred brothers who choose different paths in dealing with their tragic childhood. When the older brother found love, he starts facing tough choices: continue to feel family responsibility for his younger brother, or follow his heart to be with his girlfriend.

Plot 
As children, two brothers, Jason and Joshua Alexander, witnessed the fatal shooting of their abusive father, Mad Dog (Forest Whitaker), one night when he came home drunk and attacked their mother. Said tragedy leaves deep scars and affects them to choose different paths in their future. Jason (Allen Payne) becomes a responsible young man who works as an assistant manager and sales clerk in a Houston electronic shop and lives with his hard-working mom, Gloria (Suzzanne Douglas). Joshua (Bokeem Woodbine) has just been released from prison. Previously traumatized by his late father, Joshua has become a volatile, disturbed ex-con who is bound for a violent end. Jason and his mother try their best to make Joshua repent and change both his attitude and his ways. Unfortunately, Joshua has difficulties in staying out of trouble with both law and authority.

One day in the middle of his working hour, a beautiful young woman named Lyric (Jada Pinkett), walks into the shop to buy a television. Falling instantly in love with her, Jason desperately tries everything to pursue her. At first, Lyric rejected Jason's attempts to get closer to her, but his persistence, sincerity, kindness, and humor eventually melt her heart and change her attitude. As Jason spends more time with Lyric, he becomes inspired to do more romantic things in order to win her love. These include: borrowing a city bus for themselves to go on a date, setting up a mock picnic followed by slow dancing in an abandoned bus station, and riding in a rowboat in the bayou until the two end up kissing and making love in the woods that magically turn into a flower field, symbolizing their blooming love and unbridled passion. Despite his life has improved ever since dating Lyric, Jason is still haunted by multiple episodic nightmares of his childhood.

Meanwhile, Lyric's brother, Alonzo (Treach), is setting up a plan to rob a bank with his gang and Joshua joins in. Lyric overhears their conversation about the robbery plan and immediately tells Jason about it. Lyric warns Jason not to cross her brother, and he promises her to only talk to Joshua, followed by offering her a literal town escape together. Lyric delightfully accepts that they agree to meet at the bayou. On the following day, the robbery goes wrong as Joshua arrives late. Even worse, he causes bedlam by independently terrorizing and beating one of the bank customers, although he escapes with the gang before the police arrive. As punishment for botching the plan, Joshua is brutally tortured by Alonzo and his gang. Back at home, as Jason informs his mom about his and Lyric's agreement to move away together, Joshua returns home covered in blood, severely wounded. Enraged, Jason breaks his promise to Lyric by confronting Alonzo to avenge his brother, ensuing a vicious fight in a public restroom.

Jason reluctantly calls off his and Lyric's plan to escape town together, reasoning that Joshua would always need him, much to Lyric's utter dismay. When she furiously questions him about the nightmares that tie him to keep saving his ungrateful brother, Jason eventually opens up about his tragic family history that left him a lifetime of haunting guilt. It is revealed that after young Joshua pointed his mother's gun at Mad Dog, Jason wrestled it away from him, inadvertently killing Mad Dog himself. Having finally understood his lifelong trauma, Lyric comforts Jason. Nevertheless, she advises him to walk away from his incorrigible brother, if he wants them to stay together.

Later in the evening, while Joshua is preparing a gun in the bar, Jason starts packing his suitcase at home after earning his mom's blessing for his wish to be with Lyric. Unbeknownst to Joshua, Rat (Eddie Griffin), their good friend, notices him from the same bar and is quickly aware of his intentions. Rat immediately warns Jason about Joshua's attempt to kill Alonzo and anyone connected and/or related to him, including Lyric. As Joshua arrives at Lyric's house, he begins shooting down Alonzo's two crew members as personal revenge and finds Lyric in her bedroom. Jason races to Lyric's house and soon finds Joshua holding her at gunpoint, angrily asking about Alonzo's whereabouts as well as venting his jealousy on her for taking away his older brother. Fed up with his brother's continual selfishness and disregard for others' well-being, Jason draws his gun at Joshua to teach him a lesson. Unfortunately, Joshua accidentally shoots Lyric on the shoulder. Horrified and devastated, Jason tearfully takes the injured and unconscious Lyric with him and eventually walks away from Joshua for good. Feeling abandoned, Joshua loses his will to live and decides to kill himself, in earshot of everyone outside. Jason carries Lyric out of her home and takes her to the waiting ambulance.

The film ends with Jason and the newly-recovered Lyric riding on a bus together, now enjoying their freedom to start a new life.

Cast
 Allen Payne as Jason Alexander, the main protagonist. The 'good' son who is responsible and always puts his family's well-being and happiness above himself. Ever since he falls for Lyric, he starts to feel torn between his family or his girlfriend. 
Sean Hutchinson as Jason (age 11)
 Jada Pinkett as Lyric, Jason's love interest. A free-spirited waitress with a cold demeanor who initially had no interest in dating. She dreams of an escape and longs for a peaceful life. 
 Bokeem Woodbine as Joshua Alexander, Jason's younger brother. The  'bad' son who is alcoholic, irresponsible, criminal-minded, and a troublemaker, despite he still loves his family. He is a problematic and low-level gangster.
Burleigh Moore as Joshua (age 8)
 Anthony 'Treach' Criss as Alonzo "A-1", Lyric's older brother, Marti's boyfriend and the vicious gang leader whom Joshua works with in a bank robbery.
 Eddie Griffin as "Rat", Jason and Joshua's good friend.
 Suzzanne Douglas as Gloria Alexander, Mad Dog's widow, Jason and Joshua's mother. A self-sufficient yet wise single mother who tries to love both her sons equally, following her husband's death. She occasionally remembers the times when her late husband used to be a good and loving man before turning abusive.
 Lisa Nicole Carson as Marti, Lyric's vain co-worker as well as best friend and Alonzo's girlfriend. 
 Lahmard Tate as Ron, one of Alonzo's gang crew members.
 Forest Whitaker as "Mad Dog" Alexander, Gloria's late husband, Jason & Joshua's late father. He used to be a loving family man, but he became abusive ever since he lost his leg after coming home from Vietnam War as a veteran. 
 Wayne Dehart as Street Preacher

Reception
Jason's Lyric received generally mixed reviews from critics. It currently has a 58% approval rating on Rotten Tomatoes based on 24 reviews, with an average score of 5.8/10. The site's consensus reads: "Jason's Lyric is a sexually charged film whose violent streak weakens or, depending on your perspective, supports the melodrama."

Roger Ebert gave the movie praise for its cast's performances, director Doug McHenry's "lyrical touches" to the poetic aesthetics of Bobby Smith, Jr.'s script and its willingness to tackle dramatic themes that New Jack City and Sugar Hill also explored, concluding that, "It's not some little plot-bound genre formula. It's invigorating, how much confidence it has, and how much space it allows itself." Deborah Young from Variety praised the performances of Whitaker, Payne and Woodbine, and the visual settings created by McHenry and cinematographer Francis Kenny but felt the film's script "stumbles into a lame love story and ends in a conventional shootout and bloodbath."

Peter Rainer of the Los Angeles Times called the film "a terribly earnest melodrama with king-size ambitions", commending the filmmakers for their overall attempt at artistic cinema but found it "overextended and unbelievable both as love story and as urban tragedy." In response to his review, filmmaker Jamaa Fanaka gave high praise to the film's two main leads, its supporting cast, and the direction of McHenry. He also counteracted Rainer's opinion of the sex scenes being there to raise the film's box office, saying that its target demographic want to see romantic stories that feature two black leads in said scenes, and that the film offers them a sort of "cinematic sexual healing."

Entertainment Weeklys Lisa Schwarzbaum gave it a C, writing that she found the brotherly storyline between Jason and Joshua more compelling than the main romantic plot, saying that the latter was "so dense with big themes strung together that character development suffers. And the emotional sum is less than the interconnection of its Tragedy 101 parts." In a review for The New York Times, Caryn James criticized the filmmaking for being overly stylized with its poetic aspirations and making the plot twist "unintentionally confusing rather than deliberately holding back information" with its editing. She called Jason's Lyric "a muddled film that takes a standard urban action movie and adds a veneer of overwrought romance."

See also
Jason's Lyric (soundtrack) — soundtrack to the film.
 List of hood films

References

External links
 
 

1994 films
1990s erotic drama films
1994 romantic drama films
African-American drama films
African-American romance films
American coming-of-age films
American romantic drama films
American erotic romance films
Films about sexuality
Films set in Texas
Films shot in Houston
Gramercy Pictures films
Hood films
PolyGram Filmed Entertainment films
1990s English-language films
1990s American films
African-American films